Vitool Charernratana (born 11 September 1942) is a former Thai cyclist. He competed in the individual road race and team time trial events at the 1964 Summer Olympics.

References

External links
 

1942 births
Living people
Vitool Charernratana
Vitool Charernratana
Cyclists at the 1964 Summer Olympics
Place of birth missing (living people)